Mrozy  is a town in Mińsk County, Masovian Voivodeship, in east-central Poland. It is the seat of the gmina (administrative district) called Gmina Mrozy.

The town has a population of 3,440.

Transport
There is a railway station in Mrozy, located on the line connecting Warsaw and Terespol.

Sports
The local football club is Watra Mrozy. It competes in the lower leagues.

References

External links
 Jewish Community in Mrozy on Virtual Shtetl

Cities and towns in Masovian Voivodeship
Mińsk County
Masovian Voivodeship (1526–1795)
Warsaw Governorate
Warsaw Voivodeship (1919–1939)